Døds is the original Norwegian style of Death Diving administered, produced and promoted by the International Døds Federation through its Døds Diving World Tour, Døds Diving World Championship and other proprietary events. The Døds Diving World Tour is the official death diving league that serves as a qualifier for the Døds Diving World Championship. The Døds Diving World Championship is the pinnacle event of the sport of death diving, and has taken place in Oslo, Norway every August since it debuted in 2008 as the first official death diving competition on the global stage.  Under its Døds trademarks, the International Døds Federation produces everything from events, media productions, merchandise and training courses at Døds Academy. International Døds Federation, headquartered in Oslo, Norway, is a fully commercial organisation that works to build the sport and the death diving community internationally.

Døds is a form of extreme freestyle diving from heights jumping with stretched arms and belly first, landing in a cannonball or a shrimp position. 
There are two classes of death diving: Classic and Freestyle. In the Classic event, competitors are to fly horizontally with their arms and legs extended until they hit the water, with no rotations  Competitors curl into a fetal position just before entering the water, landing first with their feet and hands or knees and elbows to avoid serious injury; dives are judged on speed, air time, complexity, how long the diver holds the original pose, the closing and the splash. In freestyle, the competitors do various tricks during the air travel, including rotations and flips, hence the name.

The current world record in height is 31.3 meters and is held by three competing athletes: Ken Stornes (No), Tore Våge (No) and Côme Girardot (Fr). In the women's class the record is at 24.8 meters and is set by Norwegian Asbjørg Nesje.

History 

"Døds Diving" has roots as a distinctive style of diving at Frognerbadet ("the Frogner Baths") pool complex since the 1970s, where youths from the different districts of Oslo competed in performing the toughest stunts from the 10-meter. Døds is said to have been started in the summer of 1972 and was pioneered by Erling Bruno Hovden, then guitar player in Raga Rockers.

Each year since its launch in 2012, the Bruno Award is given to the best classic døds or to honour an extraordinary performance or achievement (winners below) to honour his memory. Since 2008, the Døds Diving World Championship (Norwegian: VM i Døds) has been held annually competition at Frognerbadet. In recent years the capacity has been filled with 6,000 spectators and tickets being sold out. The events have been broadcast nationally (TV2, TV2 Sport, Viasat) and internationally (ESPN).

Døds Diving World Championship winners (Men) 
 2008 Christian Kjellmann
2009 Fredrik Amundsen
2010 Vladimir Jevtic
 2011 Thord Samuelsen
 2012 Henning Marthinsen
 2013 Filip Julius Devor
 2014 Filip Julius Devor
 2015 Filip Julius Devor
 2016 Truls Torp
 2017 Truls Torp
 2018 Emil Lybekk
 2019 Kim André Knutsen
 2020 Emil Lybekk
 2021 Kim-Andre Knutsen
 2022 Leo Landrø

Bruno Award winners 
 2012 Jeppe Skageng
 2013 Per Kristen Andenæs
 2014 Morten Falteng
 2015 Simon B. Aaland
 2016 Simon B. Aaland
 2017 Håkon Høyem
 2018 Petter Andresen
 2019 Leo Landrø
 2020 Filip Julius Devor
 2021
 2022 Asbjørg Nesje

Døds Diving World Championship winners (Women) 
 2018 Miriam Hamberg
 2019 Miriam Hamberg
 2020 Ingrid Eriksen Bru
 2021 Asbjørg Nesje
 2022 Asbjørg Nesje

References 

Diving (sport)
Pages containing links to subscription-only content